Nils Robert Hellsten (7 October 1885 – 14 November 1963) was a Swedish gymnast who competed in the 1908 Summer Olympics. He was part of the Swedish team that won the all-around gold medal. He is not related to the Olympic fencer Nils Hellsten.

References

External links

1885 births
1963 deaths
Swedish male artistic gymnasts
Gymnasts at the 1908 Summer Olympics
Olympic gymnasts of Sweden
Olympic gold medalists for Sweden
Olympic medalists in gymnastics
Medalists at the 1908 Summer Olympics
Sportspeople from Stockholm